Joseph Montague Kenworthy, 10th Baron Strabolgi (7 March 1886 – 8 October 1953), was a Liberal and then a Labour Party Member of Parliament in the United Kingdom.

Education and naval service
Strabolgi was born at Leamington in Warwickshire and educated at the Eastman's Royal Naval Academy at Northward Park in Winchester and as a cadet on H.M.S. Britannia. He joined the Royal Navy in 1902 and served for seventeen years. His first posting as a naval cadet was in January 1903 to the battleship HMS Goliath, serving on the China Station. During the First World War, he was for a short but critical period in the Plans Division of the Admiralty War Staff. He left for an appointment in the Mediterranean which enabled him to see the latest developments of war on seaborne commerce at close quarters. He returned to the Grand Fleet in time to be present at the final surrender of German sea power. He resigned from the Navy in 1920 to enter Parliament.

"That Kenworthy stayed [at the Naval Staff] for only five months was probably the result of factors beyond the need to employ invalid staff. A reading of his service record and his memoirs suggest that he was a man who was neither easy to work with nor necessarily very competent. His memoirs are particularly unreliable. Of the 244 executive officers for whom it has been possible to find their Sub-Lieutenant examination results, twenty-three failed an exam (9 per cent), and Kenworthy was one of these. From his service record it is possible to see that: in 1907 he was refused permission to qualify for a navigation course; in 1911 he failed the signals course for command of a Torpedo boat; in 1912 HMS Bullfinch, of which he was in command, struck HMS Leopard, and Kenworthy was 'cautioned to be more careful'; in 1914 he was sacked from HMS Bullfinch 'on account of unsatisfactory conduct'. The Admiral Commanding Orkneys and Shetlands concluded that Kenworthy was 'not a fit person to be in command of a destroyer'. (ADM 196/50, p. 286.) It should be added in mitigation that collision between ships was not that uncommon. In any case, it is not any of these events that is telling, but the combination. Kenworthy's memoirs make no reference to his departure from HMS Bullfinch. (Kenworthy, Sailors) He merely wrote that when he left the ship the crew cheered. His entry in The Oxford Dictionary of National Biography has also failed to address these inconsistencies. (Grove, E., 'Kenworthy, Joseph Montague', in ODNB, Oxford 2004, vol. 31, 337–8.)"

Politician
Kenworthy first tried to enter Parliament at the 1918 general election contesting Rotherham as a Liberal but finished in third place. He was soon given another chance though when he was selected to contest Central Hull at a by-election in 1919. Anti-Coalition government sentiment was riding high and he was duly elected Member of Parliament for the Liberals. Kenworthy was one of the more energetic supporters of H. H. Asquith in Parliament and never lost his hostility to Lloyd George. During the 1924-29 parliament which was dominated by a Conservative majority, he worked closely with a group of radical Liberal MPs that included: William Wedgwood Benn, Percy Harris, Frank Briant and Horace Crawfurd to provide opposition to the government. 
When Lloyd George became Leader of the Liberal Party in 1926, despite the party taking on a more radical hue, Kenworthy resigned from the party and joined Labour. He also resigned his seat in the House of Commons and fought and won a by-election in Central Hull, standing for Labour. He retained the seat until 1931. 

He was an active supporter of the movement for the independence of India. In 1934, he succeeded his father as Lord Strabolgi and was the opposition chief whip in the House of Lords from 1938 to 1942. He was disappointed not to be given a position in the postwar Labour government (1945–51).

Personal life
Lord Strabolgi married twice. Firstly, in 1913, he married Doris Whitley, daughter of his fellow Liberal MP, Frederick Whitley-Thomson. They had four children, and divorced in 1941. Later that year, he married Geraldine Francis.

When he died in 1953 aged 67, he was succeeded by his eldest son, David Montague de Burgh Kenworthy, 11th Baron Strabolgi, another left-wing politician and member of the Labour Party.

Writer
During the Second World War, he wrote numerous articles on the war, especially the war at sea. These include Secret Weapons in Modern World (27 April 1940) and What’s Wrong with the British Army? in Colliers magazine (22 August 1942).

Books by Lord Strabolgi
His books include –
Peace or war? (with a foreword by H.G. Wells, Boni & Liveright, New York, 1927)
India, A Warning (E. Mathews & Marrot, London, 1931)
The Campaign in the Low Countries: the first full-length account of the epic struggle in Holland and Belgium (London 1940)
The Battle of the River Plate (Hutchinson & Co., London, 1940)
Freedom of the Seas (jointly with Sir George Young)
Our Daily Pay: the Economics of Plenty
Sailors, Statesmen and Others: an Autobiography
The Real Navy
Narvik and After
From Gibraltar to Suez: a study of the Italian Campaign
Singapore and After
Sea Power in the Second World War

Appointments
 Chairman of the English-Speaking Union
 Vice-President of The Air League of The British Empire

Sources
Strabolgi at thepeerage.com
Obituary in The Hindu – 10 October 1953
Speech at the Empire Club of Canada, 1947
Entry by Eric J Grove in Oxford Dictionary of National Biography, OUP 2004–08

References

External links 
 

1886 births
1953 deaths
Barons in the Peerage of England
Kenworthy, Joseph
Kenworthy, Joseph
Kenworthy, Joseph
Kenworthy, Joseph
Kenworthy, Joseph
Kenworthy, Joseph
Kenworthy, Joseph
UK MPs who inherited peerages
Labour Party (UK) hereditary peers
Royal Navy officers
British non-fiction writers
People educated at Eastman's Royal Naval Academy
British male writers
20th-century non-fiction writers
Male non-fiction writers
20th-century English nobility
People from Leamington Spa